Myrtenal is a bicyclic monoterpenoid with the chemical formula C10H14O. It is a naturally occurring molecule that can be found in numerous plant species including Hyssopus officinalis,  Salvia absconditiflora, and Cyperus articulatus.

Biological research 
Myrtenal was shown to inhibit acetylcholinesterase, which is a common method of treatment of alzheimer's disease and dementia, in-vitro. In addition, mytenal has been shown to have antioxidant properties in rats.

See also 
 Myrtenol

References 

Bicyclic compounds
Aldehydes
Monoterpenes